Parectinocera is a genus of flies in the family Sciomyzidae, the marsh flies or snail-killing flies. The genus was first described by Theodor Becker in 1919.

Species
Parectinocera dissimilis (Malloch, 1933)
Parectinocera inaequalis (Malloch, 1933)
Parectinocera neotropica Becker, 1919

References

Sciomyzidae
Sciomyzoidea genera
Taxa named by Theodor Becker